Jean-Denis de Montlovier (1733, Valence (Dauphiné) – 1804, Dagues near Marsanne) was an 18th-century French man of letters.

When he retired, he dedicated himself to letters. He contributed one page to the article "voleur" (thief) of the Encyclopédie by Diderot and D’Alembert where he attacks the application of the death penalty for desertion and suggests solutions.

He also composed the five-act comedy in verse entitled L’Ami de Cour, by a former soldier (Valence, Marc-Aurel).

Sources 
 Justin Brun-Durand, Dictionnaire biographique et biblio-iconographique de la Drôme, 2 vol., 1900-1901, vol. 2, p. 165-66
 Jean-Denis de Montlovier on Persée

18th-century French dramatists and playwrights
18th-century French lawyers
Contributors to the Encyclopédie (1751–1772)
1733 births
People from Valence, Drôme
1804 deaths